Ultrapotassic igneous rocks are a class of rare, volumetrically minor and generally ultramafic or mafic silica-depleted igneous rocks. 

Ultrapotassic rocks are defined by molar K2O/Na2O >3 in much of the scientific literature. In other papers written as recently as 2005, they are defined as rocks with weight percents K2O/Na2O >2. Hence, caution is indicated in interpreting use of the term "ultrapotassic", and the nomenclature of these rocks continues to be debated.

Genesis of these ultrapotassic rocks has been much discussed. The magmas probably are produced by a variety of mechanisms and from a variety of sources. The magma production may be favored by the following:
 great depth of partial melting
 low degrees of partial melting
 lithophile element (K, Ba, Cs, Rb) enrichment in sources
 peridotite (variety harzburgite) so enriched, especially in potassium
 pyroxene and phlogopite-rich volumes within the mantle, not from peridotite alone
 carbon dioxide or water in sources (each condition leading to a distinctive magma);
 reaction of melts with surrounding rock as they rise from their sources

Mantle sources of ultrapotassic magmas may contain subducted sediments, or the sources may have been enriched in potassium by melts or fluids partly derived from subducted sediments. Phlogopite and/or potassic amphibole probably are typical in the sources from which many such magmas have been derived. Ultrapotassic granites are uncommon and may be produced by melting of the continental crust above upwelling mafic magma, such as at rift zones.

Types of ultrapotassic rocks 
 Lamprophyres and melilitic rocks
 Kimberlite
 Lamproite
 Orangeite (see Group II kimberlite)
 Feldspathoid-bearing rocks such as leucitites
 K-feldspar enriched leucogranites
 Vaugnerite and Durbachite

Economic importance 
The economic importance of ultrapotassic rocks is wide and varied. Kimberlites, lamproites and perhaps even lamprophyres are known to contain diamond. These rocks are all produced at depths in excess of 120 km and thus can bring diamond to the surface as xenocrysts. Ultrapotassic granites are a known host for much granite-hosted gold mineralisation. Significant porphyry-style mineralisation is won from highly potassic to ultrapotassic granites. Ultrapotassic A-type intracontinental granites may be associated with fluorite and columbite – tantalite mineralization.

References

Ultrapotassic rocks
Igneous petrology
Geochemistry